Mae Long is a tambon (subdistrict) of Omkoi District, in Chiang Mai Province, Thailand. In 2017 it had a population of 8,065 people.

Geography
Mae Ngao National Park is in this subdistrict.

History
The subdistrict was created effective 10 August 1989 by splitting off 10 administrative villages from Yang Piang. In 2022, it was renamed from Sop Khong to Mae Long.

Administration

Central administration
The tambon is divided into 12 administrative villages (mubans).

Local administration
The area of the subdistrict is covered by the subdistrict administrative organization (SAO) Sop Khong (องค์การบริหารส่วนตำบลสบโขง).

References

External links
Thaitambon.com on Mae Long

Tambon of Chiang Mai province
Populated places in Chiang Mai province